Sharen Davis (born February 22, 1957) is an American costume designer. She has been nominated for two Academy Award for Ray and  Dreamgirls. She is a frequent collaborator with actor Denzel Washington, having worked with him five times; most recently on the film adaption of Fences.

Filmography

Television credits

Awards and nominations
Academy Awards
 Nominated: Best Costume Design, Dreamgirls (2006)
 Nominated: Best Costume Design, Ray (2004)

Costume Designers Guild Awards
 Nominated: Excellence in Sci-Fi/Fantasy Television, Watchmen (2019)
 Won: Excellence in Sci-Fi/Fantasy Television, Westworld (2018)
 Nominated: Best Costume Design, The Help (2011)
 Nominated: Best Costume Design, Dreamgirls (2006)
 Nominated: Best Costume Design, Ray (2004)

Primetime Emmy Awards
 Won: Outstanding Fantasy/Sci-Fi Costumes, Watchmen (2019)
Shared with: Valerie Zielonka, (costume supervisor) for Watchmen: "It's Summer and We're Running Out of Ice" (2019)
 Nominated: Outstanding Fantasy/Sci-Fi Costumes, Westworld (2016)
Shared with: Charlene Amateau, Jodie Stern, Sandy Kenyon for Westworld: "Akane no Mai" (2018)

Broadcast Film Critics Association Awards
 Nominated: Best Costume Design, The Help (2011)

External links 

 
 "A 'Dreamgirl' Behind-the scenes"

References

1957 births
American costume designers
Living people
Women costume designers